William Percival Harvin III (born May 28, 1988) is an American former professional football player who was a wide receiver in the National Football League (NFL). He played college football for the Florida Gators, who won the BCS National Championship in 2006 and 2008. He was selected by the Minnesota Vikings in the first round of the 2009 NFL Draft. Harvin also played for the Seattle Seahawks, New York Jets and Buffalo Bills. He was named the Associated Press Offensive Rookie of the Year in 2009 and won Super Bowl XLVIII with the Seahawks in 2013 over the Denver Broncos. He attended and played football for Landstown High School in Virginia Beach, where his team won the high school state championship in 2004.

Early life
Harvin was born to William Percival Harvin, Jr. and wife Linda in Chesapeake, Virginia, where after his father's departure, he lived with his mother and his older sister, Lintera.  His mother, Linda, ran a daycare out of their home as Harvin helped with the children. Harvin's mother ran track at Princess Anne High School in Virginia Beach and later coached an AAU track team.  His sister, Lintera, ran track, both at Salem High School in Virginia Beach and at Eastern Michigan University.  As a child, Harvin was a gifted athlete whose prowess was first noted as a six-year-old flag football participant.  At the age of 13, he played for coach Bruce Pearl and the Virginia Beach Mustangs Pop Warner football team, leading the team to a national championship.

High school career
At Landstown High School in Virginia Beach, Harvin was noted for his speed (4.32 seconds in the 40-yard dash as a freshman) and ability to make people miss in the open field.  In 2003, during his sophomore year, the Landstown Eagles were the state Group AAA runner-up in football.  A year later, Harvin led the Eagles' football team to a perfect 14-0 record and a Virginia High School League (VHSL) Group AAA Division 6 state championship.  In the title game against James Robinson High School, Harvin accounted for 476 all-purpose yards in rushing, receiving, kick returns, and interception returns, as well as scoring five touchdowns in the 47-20 victory.  In 2005, Landstown finished 13-1 after a 28-7 state championship game upset loss to Oakton High School of Vienna, Virginia.  Following his stellar high school career, Harvin participated in the 2006 U.S. Army All-American Bowl.  He also triumphed in basketball, where he helped the team to a 33-6 record and runner-up in the 2005 VHSL AAA state championship game.

After receiving National Junior Player of the Year honors in 2005, Harvin became one of the most highly acclaimed high school football players in the country.  As one of the top recruits in the 2006 high school class, Harvin was ranked number one overall by Rivals.com and the number two receiver by Scout.com.

Despite his accomplishments, Harvin's high school athletic career was not without controversy.  He served a one-game suspension early in his junior football season for unsportsmanlike conduct.  As a senior, he was suspended for the final two regular-season games after making contact with an official and using inappropriate language during a game against First Colonial High School.  In basketball, Harvin and a Green Run High School player were involved in a scuffle that prompted referees to stop the game with time remaining on the clock.  As a result of this and prior incidents, Harvin was suspended from athletic competition by the VHSL.

Despite these missteps, Harvin ranks as one of the greatest high school athletes to come out of the Hampton Roads area.  He scored 77 career touchdowns, accounted for more points than any player in South Hampton Roads history, and led Landstown High School to three consecutive Group AAA Division 6 state football championship games.  As a junior Harvin led the Landstown basketball team to the state final, and became the first athlete since 1936 to win five gold medals at the state track meet.  Despite several earlier statements that he would attend Florida State University, on December 19, 2005, Harvin committed to the University of Florida over Florida State, University of Miami (FL), University of Michigan, and University of Southern California.

Track and field
In 2000, at the age of 12, he was a member of the National Champion 4 × 100 m relay team in the Midget (11-12) Age Group.  Harvin was also a standout track athlete at the Landstown High School.  He became the first athlete in 69 years to capture five state titles at 2005 Virginia Class AAA state meet, winning the 100 meters, with a time of 10.69 seconds, 200 meters, with a time of 21.59 seconds, long jump, with a leap of 7.15 meters, and in triple jump, with a leap of 14.50 meters.  He captured the 2005 Virginia Class AAA indoor title in triple jump, with a leap of 14.70 meters. He also won the 2004 state title in long jump as a sophomore with a leap of 7.14 meters.  As a result of various incidents, Harvin was suspended from athletic competition by the Virginia High School League (VHSL).  The suspension prevented Harvin from competing in the VHSL Group AAA State Indoor Track Meet at George Mason University that year.  His loss, after becoming the first athlete to win five state track titles in the same meet during his junior year, was a huge blow to his high school track team.

Harvin's personal bests are 10.43 seconds in the 100 meters, 21.19 seconds in the 200 meters, and 7.40 meters in long jump.

College career
Harvin accepted an athletic scholarship to attend the University of Florida in Gainesville, Florida, where he played on coach Urban Meyer's Florida Gators football team from 2006 to 2008.  Harvin had an immediate and dramatic impact for the Gators as a freshman in 2006, and was a key offensive player during the Gators' national championship season in 2008.

Freshman season
Harvin made his collegiate debut for the Florida Gators on September 2, 2006 against the Southern Mississippi Golden Eagles.  Harvin was a dual threat, lining up at both running back and wide receiver. He caught three passes for 33 yards and carried the ball four times for a team-leading 58 yards. Harvin's second game was on September 9 against the Central Florida Golden Knights.  He caught four passes for 99 yards, including a 58-yard touchdown pass.  He also ran for 11 yards on two carries.  In the third and fourth games of the season, Harvin saw limited action against the Tennessee Volunteers, where he had one catch for 12 yards and one rush for 13 yards. He was injured in the second quarter and thus played very little for the rest of the game and during practice the following week .  A week later against the Kentucky Wildcats, Harvin had only one rush for two yards.  Due to his injuries, Harvin did not play against the Alabama and played sparingly against LSU.  He returned to the lineup for the Auburn game and continued his sporadic freshman year performance, rushing for a 42-yard touchdown against rival Florida State.  However, Harvin suffered a neck sprain in the game and was taken off the field on a stretcher.  Harvin returned the next week for the SEC Championship Game against Arkansas, by catching five passes for 62 yards and a touchdown.  He also ran six times for a team high 105 yards, including a 67-yard touchdown run.  With that performance, Harvin was named the game MVP.  He finished off his freshman season with a win in the BCS National Championship Game against the Ohio State Buckeyes.  In the game, Harvin lined up at quarterback numerous times, and was a factor in both the run game and the pass game with 22 yards rushing, 60 yards receiving, and a rushing touchdown.  Despite his injury-plagued freshman season, Harvin was awarded SEC College Freshman of the year.

Sophomore season
Harvin entered the 2007 season as the starting receiver for the Gators. In the season opener, a 49-3 victory over Western Kentucky, Harvin recorded 3 receptions for 53 yards and a touchdown. A week later against Troy, Harvin grabbed 3 receptions for 42 yards and a touchdown and also rushed for 56 yards on four carries. The next game, a blowout victory over Tennessee, Harvin contributed greatly with 120 yards on 4 receptions and 75 rushing yards with a touchdown. The next game Harvin grabbed 11 passes for 121 yards and a score in a 30-24 win over Mississippi. In the Gators' first loss of the season to Auburn, Harvin recorded 119 yards on 7 receptions. The game marked his third-consecutive 100-yard receiving game. The next three weeks resulted in modest numbers from Harvin, but he did go over 100 yards in either rushing or receiving. Then on November 3, Harvin had his best game of the season statistically, in a victory over Vanderbilt, when he recorded 110 receiving yards on 9 receptions and 11 rushes for 113 yards and two rushing scores. After missing the South Carolina and Florida Atlantic victories with a sinus infection, Harvin returned with a 16 rush, 157 yard performance with a rushing touchdown against Florida State. The Gators took their 9-3 record to the Capital One Bowl in Orlando, where they lost to University of Michigan, 35-41. He put up monster numbers as he had 9 receptions for 77 yards and a touchdown, also rushing for 165 yards and a score. He finished the season with 858 yards on 59 receptions for 4 touchdowns. He also totaled 764 yards on 83 rushes for 6 touchdowns for a total of 1,622 yards from scrimmage and 10 touchdowns, becoming the first receiver in University of Florida history to have over 1,000 yards rushing and receiving in his career. Harvin earned All-SEC first team honors as an all-purpose player, while earning second team honors as a receiver. He was named to the preseason All-American list and the Heisman Trophy contenders list in March 2008.

Junior season
In the spring prior to his junior season, Harvin underwent arthroscopic heel surgery on his right heel to address the underlying issue that caused injury trouble throughout his career (achilles tendonitis, knee tendonitis, hip flexor, hamstring and quadriceps issues) dating back to his high school days in Virginia Beach. The surgery was performed by Dr. Robert Anderson of OrthoCarolina of Charlotte, North Carolina. Due to the invasive nature of the procedure, the recovery time was very long and associated with significant risk. Harvin used the recovery to his advantage though. Limited to on-field practice and running, he focused his efforts on getting stronger, increasing his weight to 205 pounds and notably increasing his bench press max to 405 pounds.
In light of his increased strength and past production from the running back position, Florida head coach Urban Meyer officially announced his position had changed from wide receiver to running back, prior to the start of the season.  However, Harvin continued to line up as a receiver for the Gators on a part-time basis. In fact, he was more of a full-time receiver than a running back.

Initially expected to be ready for the season opener against Hawaii, team doctors and the coaches felt he was not fully ready to play, and kept him out of the game. He made his season debut in the much anticipated game against Miami, seeing limited action he amassed 39 total yards on one reception and five carries, scoring a rushing touchdown. After that game Harvin was given the green light to play without concern for the surgically repaired heel. Later in the season, Harvin suffered another ankle injury in a game against FSU on November 20. Harvin appeared to have suffered a high ankle sprain from a tackle and hobbled off the field, and did not return. This injury prevented him from playing in the SEC Championship on December 6 in which the Gators defeated Alabama 31-20. Going into the 2009 BCS National Championship Game against Oklahoma, Harvin had totaled 35 receptions for 595 yards and seven touchdowns, as well as 61 rushes for 538 yards and 9 touchdowns. In the game, he accounted for nine carries for 122 yards with a touchdown, and five catches for 49 yards, playing on the injured ankle. Urban Meyer stated the day after the game that Harvin had suffered a hairline fracture in his lower right leg in addition to the high ankle sprain.

On January 15, 2009, Harvin announced he would forgo his remaining college eligibility and participate in the 2009 NFL Draft. Harvin finished his college career as one of the most prolific offensive threats in school history. In three seasons, he totaled 133 catches for 1,929 yards and 13 touchdowns, while rushing the ball 194 times for 1,852 yards with 19 touchdowns. His 32 career touchdowns is the most ever by a University of Florida wide receiver. He averaged an astounding 9.5 yards per carry as a running back and averaged 11.6 yards overall (running back, receiver, return man). He was the first player in University of Florida history to rush for 100 yards and have 100 yards receiving in the same game (against Vanderbilt, 2007).

Professional career

NFL Combine

In February 2009, Harvin tested positive for marijuana at the NFL Combine. Some teams reportedly removed him from their potential draft rosters.

Minnesota Vikings

On April 25, 2009, Harvin was selected by the Minnesota Vikings with the 22nd overall pick in the first round of the 2009 NFL Draft, the fourth wide receiver selected in the draft. Following extended contract negotiations, on August 3, 2009, Harvin signed a five-year contract worth up to $14.5 million, including $8.7 million in guarantees. Harvin wore jersey #12 for the Minnesota Vikings.

2009 season 
Harvin caught his first touchdown pass September 13, 2009 in the season opener against the Cleveland Browns, thrown by quarterback Brett Favre.  He ended his first career NFL game with a total of 36 yards receiving and 22 yards rushing. On September 27, Harvin had a 101-yard kickoff return for a touchdown against the San Francisco 49ers. With this touchdown, Harvin became the first Viking ever to score a touchdown in each of his first three games as well as the second youngest player to return a kickoff for a touchdown in NFL history (21 years, 122 days). On October 25, 2009, Harvin had an 88-yard kickoff return for a touchdown against the Pittsburgh Steelers. He finished the regular season with 60 receptions and eight touchdowns, two on kickoff returns, and a rushing average of nine yards per carry.

On January 4, Harvin was a late addition to the 2010 Pro Bowl roster as a kick returner. Harvin filled a spot created because the Philadelphia Eagles's DeSean Jackson made the NFC team at two positions—wide receiver and kick returner. On January 6, the Associated Press announced Harvin's selection as the AP Offensive Rookie of the Year. Harvin is the sixth Vikings player to win the award, joining Adrian Peterson (2007), Randy Moss (1998), Sammy White (1976), Chuck Foreman (1973) and Paul Flatley (1963). On January 14, he was named Sporting News' 2009 NFL Rookie of the Year. Harvin later declined the offer to play in the Pro Bowl.

2010 season 
After a stellar first year in the NFL, Harvin suffered a string of illnesses. On April 30, 2009, while en route to a Minnesota Vikings rookie mini-camp, Harvin fell ill and was hospitalized prior to changing planes in Atlanta. He was released from the hospital the following day. Vikings coach Brad Childress said Harvin was dehydrated and had a virus. Additionally, Harvin did not participate in the 2009 NFL Rookie Symposium due to illness and also missed the team's first three practices and first two days of training camp at Minnesota State University, Mankato. Further, Harvin did not play in the Vikings 30-10 victory over the Cincinnati Bengals in week 14 due to migraine headaches, which also prevented him from practicing the following week. However, he did play in the Vikings week 16 overtime loss to the Chicago Bears, but missed two postseason practices before the New Orleans Saints playoff game, due to migraine headaches. On August 19, 2010, he passed out during practice due to a migraine attack and was taken to a local hospital in an ambulance. He was discharged from the hospital the following day but remained on the sidelines in practice.

2011 season 
On September 11, 2011 in the season opener against the San Diego Chargers, Harvin returned a 103-yard game opening kick off for a touchdown, setting a Vikings franchise record of 4 career kick off return touchdowns. On November 27, 2011 in a Vikings game against the Atlanta Falcons in Atlanta, Harvin returned a kickoff for 104 yards, to the Falcons 3-yard line. This was the longest non-scoring play in NFL history, a feat made again by Ameer Abdullah in 2015. However, the Vikings failed to score on the next 4 plays. Harvin led the Vikings with 87 receptions for the 2011 season. He scored 6 touchdowns and was active for all 16 games for the first (and only) time in his NFL career.

2012 season 
In the first six games of the 2012 season, Harvin had three games with over 100 yards receiving. On December 6, 2012 Harvin was placed on injured reserve with an ankle injury. Harvin's season ended with 62 receptions of 85 targets for 677 yards and 3 touchdowns. Harvin rushed for 96 yards on 22 attempts and 1 touchdown. He returned 16 kickoffs for 574 yards with 1 touchdown.

Seattle Seahawks

2013 season 

The Minnesota Vikings traded Harvin to the Seattle Seahawks on March 11, 2013 in exchange for a first (Xavier Rhodes was selected with the pick) and seventh-round draft pick in the 2013 Draft, and a third-round draft pick in the 2014 Draft. Immediately after the Seahawks acquired Harvin, they signed him to a new six-year, $67 million contract with $25.5 million guaranteed. Harvin selected the number 11 to wear with the Seahawks, as the number 12 is retired for the Seahawks fanbase "The 12th Man". This trade reunited him with offensive coordinator Darrell Bevell, quarterback Tarvaris Jackson, and wide receiver Sidney Rice, all of whom he worked with during his time in Minnesota.

Harvin was diagnosed with a slight labrum tear in his hip while training during the offseason. On August 1, 2013, Harvin underwent successful hip surgery. On August 27, 2013, the Seahawks placed Harvin on the reserve/physically unable to perform list.

On November 11, 2013, the Seahawks activated Harvin from the reserve/physically unable to perform list. Harvin made his Seahawks debut during Week 11 against his old team, the Vikings, making 1 reception for 17 yards and a kick return for 58 yards. A week following his first game of the 2013 season, Harvin experienced inflammation in his recently surgically repaired hip which prevented him from playing. He was ruled out for Week 15 after dealing with soreness in the same hip on which he had surgery.

After not playing in the NFC Championship game due to a concussion, Harvin returned the opening kickoff of the second half of Super Bowl XLVIII 87 yards for a touchdown, helping the Seahawks win their first Super Bowl title.

Harvin allegedly had locker room altercations with teammates during his tenure with Seattle; also reported was that there were games where he sat himself down, refusing to go back on the field.

New York Jets

2014 season 
Harvin was traded to the New York Jets on October 17, 2014 for a conditional draft pick in the 2015 NFL Draft. With the number 11 already taken and the number 12 retired for Joe Namath, Harvin wore the number 16. In his lone Jets season, Harvin recorded 29 receptions out of 52 targets for 350 yards with one touchdown and 110 rushing yards on 22 attempts. Harvin also had 20 kickoff returns for 495 yards. He was released on March 10, 2015 after the team traded for Brandon Marshall.

Buffalo Bills

2015 season 
On March 18, 2015, Harvin signed a one-year, $6 million contract with the Buffalo Bills. He was placed on injured reserve on November 7. Harvin's season ended with 19 catches on 30 targets for 218 yards and a touchdown with an additional 31 rushing yards on five attempts.

2016 season 
On April 15, 2016, Harvin announced his retirement from the NFL stating that he needed time to recover from injury but didn't rule out a possible return. On November 1, 2016, Harvin signed a one-year contract with the Buffalo Bills, coming out of retirement to re-join the team due to injuries to wideouts Sammy Watkins and Greg Salas.

On November 7, 2016, Harvin appeared in his first game of the season in a Monday Night Football game against his former team, the Seattle Seahawks. Harvin began to experience severe migraine headaches that kept him out two games and was placed on reserve/non-football illness list, ending his season early after coming out of retirement.

On March 14, 2017, Harvin announced his retirement from the NFL for the second time in his career.

NFL career statistics

Regular season

Postseason

NFL records
 Longest non-scoring play: 104 (2011 vs Atlanta Falcons)

Minnesota Vikings records
 Most career kickoff return touchdowns (5) (Tied with Cordarrelle Patterson)
 Most kickoff return touchdowns in a single season: 2 (2009) (Tied with Cordarrelle Patterson)

Awards and honors
 Midget Age Group 4x100-meter relay national championship team (2000)
 Pop Warner Football national championship (2001)
 Virginia Beach District Offensive Player of the Year (2004)
 Virginia Eastern Region Offensive Player of the Year (2004)
 Rivals.com National High School Junior of the Year (2004)
 Parade High School All-American (2005)
 U.S. Army All-American Bowl participant (2006)
 Southeastern Conference (SEC) Freshman of the Year by Association Press (2006)
 SEC Championship Game Most Valuable Player (2006)
 SEC Championship (2006)
 Bowl Coalition Series (BCS) National Championship (2006)
 Second-team All-SEC selection (wide receiver) by Associated Press and SEC coaches (2007)
 First-team All-SEC selection (all-purpose) by Associated Press (2007)
 First-team All-American (wide receiver) by The Sporting News (2007)
 SEC Championship (2008)
 BCS National Championship (2008)
 Second-team All-SEC selection (wide receiver) by Associated Press (2008)
 First-team All-SEC selection (wide receiver) by SEC coaches (2008)
 First-team All-SEC selection (all-purpose) by Associated Press (2008)
 First-team All-American (all-purpose) by American Football Coaches Association (AFCA) and Rivals.com (2008)
 Second-team All-American (all-purpose) by Associated Press (2008)
 Second-team All-American (wide receiver) by Walter Camp Football Foundation (2008)
 First-team All-American (wide receiver) by The Sporting News (2008)
 Pepsi NFL Rookie of the Week (Week 7, 2009)
 Pepsi NFL Rookie of the Week (Week 8, 2009)
 Pro Bowl kick returner (2010)
 Associated Press Offensive Rookie of the Year (2009)
 All-Pro selection by The Sporting News (2009)
 Sporting News NFL Rookie of the Year (2009)
 Pepsi NFL Rookie of the Year (2009)

See also

 2006 Florida Gators football team
 2007 College Football All-America Team
 2008 College Football All-America Team
 2008 Florida Gators football team
 List of Florida Gators football All-Americans
 List of Florida Gators in the NFL Draft
 List of Minnesota Vikings first-round draft picks

References

Bibliography
 Carlson, Norm, University of Florida Football Vault: The History of the Florida Gators, Whitman Publishing, LLC, Atlanta, Georgia (2007).  .

External links
 Official site 
 Florida Gators bio 
 Seattle Seahawks bio 
 New York Jets bio 
 Buffalo Bills bio

1988 births
Living people
Sportspeople from Chesapeake, Virginia
Sportspeople from Virginia Beach, Virginia
Players of American football from Virginia
African-American players of American football
American football return specialists
American football wide receivers
Florida Gators football players
All-American college football players
Minnesota Vikings players
Seattle Seahawks players
New York Jets players
Buffalo Bills players
National Conference Pro Bowl players
21st-century African-American sportspeople
20th-century African-American people
National Football League Offensive Rookie of the Year Award winners